STD 8 refers to two Internet Engineering Task Force standards proposed by Jonathan B. Postel and  Joyce K. Reynolds from University of Southern California Information Sciences Institute in their Request for Comments published in May 1983.
Among other features Telnet protocol was assigned server port 23.
 STD 8 (RFC 854): Telnet Protocol Specification
 STD 8 (RFC 855): Telnet Option Specifications

References

External links
List of Full Standard RFCs
Official Internet Protocol Standards

Internet Standards
Telnet